Andreas Steier (born 7 January 1972) is a German engineer and politician of the Christian Democratic Union (CDU) who served as a member of the Bundestag from the state of Rhineland-Palatinate from 2017 to 2021.

Political career 
Steier became a member of the Bundestag in the 2017 German federal election. In parliament, he was a member of the Committee on Education, Research and Technology Assessment. In this capacity, he served as his parliamentary group’s rapporteur on artificial intelligence.

References

External links 

  
 Bundestag biography 

1972 births
Living people
Members of the Bundestag for Rhineland-Palatinate
Members of the Bundestag 2017–2021
Members of the Bundestag for the Christian Democratic Union of Germany